Aavo is an Estonian masculine given name. As of 1 January 2021, Aavo was the 220th most popular male name in Estonia. The name Aavo is the most common in Põlva County, where 12.12 per 10,000 inhabitants of the county bear the name.

Individuals bearing the name Aavo include:

Aavo-Valdur Mikelsaar (born 1941), medical scientist and geneticist
Aavo Mölder (born 1944), politician
Aavo Ots (born 1951), trumpet player, conductor and music teacher 
Aavo Pikkuus (born 1954), cyclist
Aavo Põhjala (born 1957), judoka and judoka coach
Aavo Sarap (born 1962), football coach
Aavo Sillandi (1912–1983), an footballer and coach
Aavo Sirk (born 1945), physicist

References

Masculine given names
Estonian masculine given names